NGC 6826 (also known as Caldwell 15) is a planetary nebula located  in the constellation Cygnus. It is commonly referred to as the "blinking planetary", although many other nebulae exhibit such "blinking". When viewed through a small telescope, the brightness of the central star overwhelms the eye when viewed directly, obscuring the surrounding nebula. However, it can be viewed well using averted vision, which causes it to "blink" in and out of view as the observer's eye wanders.

A distinctive feature of this nebula are the two bright patches on either side, which are known as Fast Low-Ionization Emission Regions, or FLIERS. They appear to be relatively young, moving outwards at supersonic speeds.

The central star of the planetary nebula is an O-type star with a spectral type of O6fp.

Gallery

See also
 List of NGC objects
 Planetary nebulae

References

External links

 
 

Cygnus (constellation)
Planetary nebulae
6826
015b